The Kevah was a French automobile manufactured from 1920 until 1924.  Built by Muller, Allen-Sommer and Robert at La Garenne-Colombes, the cyclecar had vee-twin 1100 cc Train or MAG engines, and was considered well-made.  The company offered a four-cylinder 898 cc sv Chapuis-Dornier-powered car with three-speed gearbox in 1923.

References
David Burgess Wise, The New Illustrated Encyclopedia of Automobiles

Defunct motor vehicle manufacturers of France